This is a list of principal characters in Homer's Iliad and Odyssey.

Greeks in the Trojan War
Achilles, the leader of the Myrmidons, son of Peleus and Thetis, and the principal Greek champion whose anger is one of the main elements of the story.
Agamemnon, King of Mycenae, supreme commander of the Achaean armies whose actions provoke the feud with Achilles; elder brother of King Menelaus.
Ajax or Aias, also known as Telamonian Ajax (he was the son of Telamon) and Greater Ajax, was the tallest and strongest warrior (after Achilles) to fight for the Achaeans.
Ajax the Lesser, an Achaean commander, son of Oileus often fights alongside Great Ajax; the two together are sometimes called the "Ajaxes" (Aiante).
 Antilochus (Ἀντίλοχος), son of Nestor sacrificed himself to save his father in the Trojan War along with other deeds of valor
 Calchas, a powerful Greek prophet and omen reader, who guided the Greeks through the war with his predictions.
 Deiochus was an Achaean soldier killed by Paris during the siege of Troy.
Diomedes (also called "Tydides"), the youngest of the Achaean commanders, famous for wounding two gods,  Aphrodite and Ares.
Helen the wife of Menelaus, the King of Sparta.  Paris visits Menelaus in Sparta.  With the assistance of Aphrodite, Paris and Helen fall in love and elope back to Troy, but in Sparta her elopement is considered an abduction.
Idomeneus, King of Crete and Achaean commander. Leads a charge against the Trojans in Book 13.
Menelaus, King of Sparta and the abandoned husband of Helen. He is the younger brother of Agamemnon.
Nestor, of Gerênia and the son of Neleus. He was said to be the only one of his brothers to survive an assault from Heracles. Oldest member of the entire Greek army at Troy.
Odysseus, another warrior-king, famed for his cunning, who is the main character of another (roughly equally ancient) epic, the Odyssey.
Patroclus, beloved companion of Achilles.
Phoenix (Φοῖνιξ), an old Achaean warrior, greatly trusted by Achilles, who acts as mediator between Achilles and Agamemnon.
Teucer (Τεῦκρος), Achaean archer, half-brother of Ajax.

Trojans in the siege of Troy
Aeneas, son of Aphrodite; cousin of Hector; Hector's principal lieutenant; the only major Trojan figure to survive the war.  Held by later tradition to be the forefather of the founders of Rome.  See the Aeneid.
Agenor (Ἀγήνωρ), a Trojan warrior who attempts to fight Achilles in Book 21.
Andromache (Ἀνδρομάχη), wife of Hector and later slave of Achilles' son, Neoptolemus after the war.
Antenor (Ἀντήνωρ), a Trojan nobleman who argues that Helen should be returned to Menelaus in order to end the war. In some versions he ends up betraying Troy by helping the Greeks unseal the city gates.
Cassandra (Κασσάνδρα), a daughter of King Priam and Queen Hecuba; Cassandra's prophecies are ignored as a result of displeasing Apollo.
Glaucus (Γλαῦκος), co-leader, with his cousin Sarpedon, of the Lycian forces allied to the Trojan cause.
Hector, firstborn son of King Priam, husband of Andromache, father of Astyanax; leader of the Trojan and allied armies, and heir apparent to the throne of Troy.
Laodice (Λαοδίκη), was the most beautiful of daughter of Priam who fell in love with Acamas, son of Theseus.
Lycaon (Λυκάων), a son of Priam and Laothoe, daughter of the Lelegian king Altes; not to be confused with Lycaon, the father of Pandarus of Zeleia, who fought at Troy.
Pandarus (Πάνδαρος), archer who shoots and wounds Menelaus with an arrow, sabotaging an attempt to reclaim Helen.
Paris, Trojan prince and Hector's brother; also called Alexander.  His abduction of Helen is the casus belli of the Trojan War.  He was supposed to have been killed as a baby because his sister Cassandra foresaw that he would cause the destruction of Troy; he was, however, raised by a shepherd.
Polydamas (Πολυδάμας), a young Trojan commander, a lieutenant and friend of Hector.
Priam, king of the Trojans, son and successor of Laomedon; husband of Queen Hecuba, father of Hector and Paris; too old to take part in the fighting; many of his fifty sons are counted among the Trojan commanders.
Sarpedon (Σαρπηδών), a son of Zeus and Laodamia, daughter of Bellerophon; co-leader, with his cousin Glaucus, of the Lycian forces allied to the Trojan cause.
Theano (Θεανώ) was the priestess of Athena in Troy and wife of Antenor.

Allies of the Trojans 
 Memnon, a king of Ethiopia who fought on the side of Troy during the Trojan War
 Rhesus, a king of Thrace who sided with Troy in the Trojan War
 Penthesilea (Πενθεσίλεια), an Amazon queen who fought in the Trojan War on the side of Troy

Family and servants of Odysseus 
Laertes, father of Odysseus.
Penelope, Odysseus' faithful wife. She uses her quick wits to put off her many suitors and remain loyal to her errant husband.
Telemachus, the son of Odysseus and Penelope, who matures during his travels to Sparta and Pylos and then fights Penelope's suitors with Odysseus.
Eurycleia, Odysseus' former wet nurse, the first person to recognize him upon his return to Ithaca.
Eumaeus, a loyal old friend and swineherd of Odysseus, who helps him retake his palace.
Melantho, a favorite slave of Penelope's, though undeserving. She works against her mistress, sleeps with Eurymachus, and is rude to guests. After Odysseus kills the suitors, Telemachus hangs her for her disloyalty.

Suitors of Penelope

Amphinomus
Antinous
Eurymachus
Leocritus

Slaves
Aethra, the principal slave in Helen's household at Troy. She was the mother of Theseus, stolen many years before the Trojan War by the Dioscuri as revenge for her son's kidnapping of their sister Helen.
Briseis, a woman captured in the sack of Lyrnessus, a small town in the territory of Troy, and awarded to Achilles as a prize. Agamemnon takes her from Achilles in Book 1 and Achilles withdraws from battle as a result.
Chryseis, Chryses’ daughter, taken as a war prize by Agamemnon.
Clymene, servant of Helen along with her mother Aethra.
Diomede, a slave woman of Achilles' whom he took from Lesbos.
Hecamede, a woman taken from Tenedos and given to Nestor. She mixes his medicinal wines.
Iphis, a woman from Skyros whom Achilles gave to Patroclus.
Phylo, maid of Helen.

Deities
 Aphrodite, goddess of love, beauty, and sexual pleasure. Wife of Hephaestus, and lover of Ares.
 Apollo, god of the sun, light, knowledge, healing, plague and darkness, the arts, music, poetry, prophecy, archery. Son of Zeus and Leto, twin of Artemis. 
 Ares, god of war. Lover of Aphrodite. Driven from the field of battle by Diomedes (aided by Athena).
 Athena, goddess of crafts, domestic arts, strategic warfare, and wisdom. Daughter of Zeus.
 Eos, goddess of dawn.
 Hephaestus,  god of blacksmiths, craftsmen, artisans, sculptors, metals, metallurgy, fire and volcanoes. 
 Hera, goddess of birth, family, marriage, and women. Sister and wife of Zeus, queen of the gods.
 Hermes, messenger of the gods, leads Priam into Achilles' camp in book 24.
 Iris, messenger of Zeus and Hera.
 Poseidon, god of the sea and earthquake, brother of Zeus. Curses Odysseus.
 Scamander, river god who fought on the side of the Trojans during the Trojan War 
 Thetis, a sea nymph or goddess. Mother of Achilles, wife of Peleus.
 Zeus, king of the gods, brother of Poseidon and Hera and father of Athena, Aphrodite, Ares, and Apollo.

References

Bibliography
 Homer, The Iliad with an English Translation by A.T. Murray, Ph.D. in two volumes. Cambridge, MA., Harvard University Press; London, William Heinemann, Ltd. 1924. Online version at the Perseus Digital Library.

External links
 Greek Mythology Encyclopedia s.v. Aesymnus Maarten Hendriksz. © 2014
 Characters from Greek Mythology. Page by J. Mark Sugars Ph.D, and Diane Bouvier. s.v. Aesymnus Produced by Fzip 1.7 © 01/11/2007. Source © 01/09/2004.

Homeric